Delbar may refer to:
 Divisor, a mathematical concept
 Delbar, Iran, a village in Razavi Khorasan Province, Iran
 Delbar, Kerman, a village in Kerman Province, Iran
 Delvar, a city in Iran
 Delbar Sadat, a village in Iran
 Delbar-e Rok Rok, a village in Iran